Clarkabad is a Christian-majority village located in Kasur, Punjab, Pakistan.

History
It was founded by an English missionary, Robert Clark who purchased 1900 acres of land from the government.

The land, which was drained once canal system established, was allocated to the Chuhras who left their traditional occupation as sweepers and became farmers.

References

Kasur District
Villages in Punjab, Pakistan
Christianity in Punjab, Pakistan